Ahmadou Ahidjo Stadium is a multi-purpose stadium in Yaoundé, Cameroon.  It is used mostly for football matches and it also has athletics facilities. It was built in 1972. The stadium has been renovated in 2016 ahead of the African Women Cup of Nations tournament. It has a capacity of 42,500 seats.  It is the home stadium of Canon Yaoundé, Tonnerre Yaoundé and the women's club Louves Minproff. The stadium is also known as the home venue of the Cameroonian national football team, who drew the stadium's record attendance of 120,000 in a football match in the 1980s.  It is one of the 2021 Africa Cup of Nations venues.

References

External links

Photos at cafe.daum.net/stade
Photo at worldstadiums.com
Photos at fussballtempel.net

Sports venues completed in 1972
Athletics (track and field) venues in Cameroon
Buildings and structures in Yaoundé
Canon Yaoundé
Sport in Yaoundé
Cameroon
Multi-purpose stadiums in Cameroon
Football venues in Cameroon